The 2021 Northwest Territories Scotties Tournament of Hearts, the women's territorial curling championship for the Northwest Territories, was held from January 30 to 31 at the Yellowknife Curling Centre in Yellowknife, Northwest Territories. The winning Kerry Galusha rink represented the Northwest Territories at the 2021 Scotties Tournament of Hearts in Calgary, Alberta, and finished with a 4–4 record, just missing the championship round. The event was held in conjunction with the 2021 Northwest Territories Men's Curling Championship, the territorial men's championship.

Kerry Galusha won her 18th territorial championship by defeating Cassie Rogers 10–6 in the final. The event was held in a three team round robin between Galusha, Rogers and Sarah Stroeder.

Teams
The teams are listed as follows:

Round-robin standings
Final round-robin standings

Round-robin results
All draws are listed in Mountain Standard Time (UTC−07:00).

Draw 1
Saturday, January 30, 10:00 am

Draw 2
Saturday, January 30, 4:30 pm

Draw 3
Sunday, January 31, 10:00 am

Final
Sunday, January 31, 4:30 pm

References

External links
 CurlingZone

Northwest Territories
Curling in the Northwest Territories
January 2021 sports events in Canada
2021 in the Northwest Territories